Livade  may refer to:

 Livađe, a village in Serbia
 Livade, Croatia, a village in Istria
 Livade, Kosovo, a settlement in the municipality of Gračanica
 Livade, Danilovgrad, a village in Montenegro